was a Japanese cross-country skier. He competed at the 1968 Winter Olympics and the 1972 Winter Olympics.

References

External links
 

1945 births
2017 deaths
Japanese male cross-country skiers
Olympic cross-country skiers of Japan
Cross-country skiers at the 1968 Winter Olympics
Cross-country skiers at the 1972 Winter Olympics
Sportspeople from Aomori Prefecture
20th-century Japanese people